Kantharmadam (OR Kandarmadam) (is a village in the Northern Province of Sri Lanka. It is located 1 km north of Jaffna Town and 1 km away from a historical Hindu temple named நல்லூர் கந்தசாமி கோவில். Jaffna Hindu Ladies College on the middle of Kantharmadam and additionally South side Jaffna University & West side Jaffna Hindu College.

Villages in Jaffna District
Nallur DS Division